Algood may refer to:
Algood, Bidar, India
Algood, Tennessee, USA